A Hungarian (or Hungarian-style) shield was a specific form of targe. It was rectangular at the bottom, but the upper edge swept upward forming a curve. The elongated upper edge was designed to protect the head and neck against sabre cuts. They were characteristic for the Hungarian light cavalry. During the 16th century, the design became popular across much of eastern Europe, among both Christian and Muslim horsemen.

Up to the 15th century, this type was in use in Germany as well as in Hungary. The 15th-century German Gladiatoria fechtbuch depicts what it calls "ungrischer schilt" used by two fencers on foot. The upward sweeping edge is less pronounced than a point attached to the lower edge, apparently for offensive use, similar to a pata.

External links
16th century example (www.metmuseum.org)

Medieval shields
Shields